Joseph Williams (born 1897, date of death unknown) was a British athlete. He competed in the men's individual cross country event at the 1924 Summer Olympics.

References

External links
 

1897 births
Year of death missing
Athletes (track and field) at the 1924 Summer Olympics
British male long-distance runners
Olympic athletes of Great Britain
Place of birth missing
Olympic cross country runners